Ivanovka is a rural locality (a selo) and the administrative centre of Ivanovsky Selsoviet, Khaybullinsky District, Bashkortostan, Russia. The population was 877 as of 2010. There are 5 streets.

Geography 
Ivanovka is located 33 km northwest of Akyar (the district's administrative centre) by road. Pugachevo is the nearest rural locality.

References 

Rural localities in Khaybullinsky District